The 1939 Central Michigan Bearcats football team represented Central Michigan College of Education, later renamed Central Michigan University, as an independent during the 1939 college football season. In their third season under head coach Ron Finch, the Bearcats compiled an 8–1 record, shut out six opponents, and outscored their opponents by a combined total of 167 to 40. The team's sole loss was by a 20–7 score to Gus Dorais' 1939 Detroit Titans football team.

Schedule

References

Central Michigan
Central Michigan Chippewas football seasons
Central Michigan Bearcats football